Gerald William Bullett (30 December 1893 – 3 January 1958) was a British man of letters. He was known as a novelist, essayist, short story writer, critic and poet. He wrote both supernatural fiction and some children's literature. A few of his books were published under the pseudonym Sebastian Fox.

Biography
Bullett was born in London, the son of businessman Robert Bullet and Ellen Bullett (née Pegg), and educated at Jesus College, Cambridge. During the Second World War he worked for the BBC in London, and after the war was a radio broadcaster. Bullett also contributed to the Times Literary Supplement. Politically, Bullett described himself as a "liberal socialist" and claimed to detest "prudery, prohibition, blood sports, central heating, and literary tea parties". Bullett was also an anti-fascist, describing fascism as "gangsterism on a national scale"; he publicly backed the Republican side during the Spanish Civil War.

One of his novels was Mr. Godly Beside Himself (1924), a humorous fantasy story about a modern man who exchanges places with his doppelganger in fairyland. Brian Stableford likens Bullet's novel to other works of post First World War British fantasy, such as Stella Benson's Living Alone (1919), and Hope Mirrlees' Lud-in-the-Mist (1926).

Bullett was a great admirer of Walt Whitman, and wrote an essay on Whitman for the book Great Democrats by Alfred Barratt Brown. Here he described Whitman as "a man full-blooded and brotherly, unselfconscious in his democracy and genuinely at ease with all kinds and classes".

Bullett died in Chichester, West Sussex, on 3 January 1958.

Works

 The Progress of Kay, A Series of Glimpses (1916)
 Mice and other poems (1921)
 The Street of the Eye and Nine Other Tales (1923)
 Mr Godly Beside Himself (1924)
 Walt Whitman: A Study and a Selection (1924)
 The Baker's Cart and Other Tales (1925) 
 Modern English Fiction (1926)
 Seed of Israel: Tales from the English Bible (1927)
 The Spanish Caravel (1927); later The Happy Mariners (1956)
 "Dreaming" (1928) – essay
 The World in Bud and Other Tales (1928) 
 Nicky Son of Egg (1929)
 The History of Egg Pandervil (1929)
 Germany (1930)
 Remember Mrs Munch (1931)
 Marden Fee (1931)
 Helen's Lovers and Other Tales (1932)
 I'll Tell You Everything (1932), by Bullett and J. B. Priestley
 The Quick and The Dead (1933)
 Eden River (1934)
 The Bubble (1934)
 The Jury (1935) – filmed as The Last Man to Hang? in 1956
 The Snare of the Fowler: A Tragedy of Time & Chance (1936), as by Sebastian Fox
 Poems in Pencil (1937)
 The Innocence of G. K. Chesterton (1937)
 The Bending Sickle (1938) – novel
 Twenty Four Tales (1938) 
 When the Cat's Away (1940)
 A Man of Forty (1940)
 Winter Solstice (1943)
 The Elderbrook Brothers (1945)
 Judgment in Suspense (1946) – novel
 George Eliot (1947)
 Men at High Table and The House of Strangers (1948)
 Poems (1949)
 Cricket in Heaven (1949)
 The English Mystics (1950)
 Sydney Smith, a Biography and a Selection (1951)
 The Trouble at Number Seven (1952)
 News From The Village (1952) – poems
 The Alderman’s Son (1954) – novel
 Windows On A Vanished Time (1955)
 One Man's Poison (1956), as by Sebastian Fox
 The Daughters of Mrs Peacock (1957) 
 Odd Woman Out (1958), as by Sebastian Fox
 The Peacock Brides (1958)
 Ten-Minute Tales and Some Others (1959)
 Collected Poems (1959), selected by E. M. W. Tillyard

As editor 

 Short Stories of To-day and Yesterday (1929)
 The Testament of Light (1932) – anthology
 The Pattern of Courtesy: An Anthology, Continuing the Testament of Light (1934)
 A Book of Good Faith – Montaigne: A Miscellany of Passages (1938)
 The Phœnix and Turtle (1938) 
 The Jackdaw's Nest, A Fivefold Anthology (1939)
 The English Galaxy of Shorter Poems (1942)
 Readings in English Literature: From Chaucer to Matthew Arnold (1945)
 Silver Poets of the 16th Century (1947)

As translator 

 The Golden Year of Fan Cheng-Ta: A Chinese Rural Sequence Rendered into English Verse (1946)

References

External links

 
 
 
 
 
 
 Sebastian Fox at LC Authorities, with no records, and at WorldCat

1893 births
1958 deaths
20th-century English male writers
20th-century British short story writers
20th-century English novelists
20th-century English poets
20th-century essayists
Alumni of Jesus College, Cambridge
British male essayists
British male poets
English anti-fascists
English essayists
English fantasy writers
English male non-fiction writers
English male novelists
English male short story writers
English short story writers
English socialists
Writers from London
20th-century pseudonymous writers